The Jinding, elevation , is the main peak of Mount Emei, a UNESCO World Heritage Site in Sichuan, China. It is also a common name for the Buddhist Huazang Temple built on the summit. Jinding is the highest Buddhist temple in traditionally Han areas of China.

Jinding is known for its "four wonders": the sunrise, the sea of clouds, the "Buddhist halo", and the "divine light".

History 
The Huazang Temple was originally built in 1377 during the Ming dynasty, but has been rebuilt multiple times because of fire. The most recent incident happened in 1972, during the Cultural Revolution, when the temple was used for transmitting signals of a local television station. On April 8 at 9:30am, flames caused by a power generator quickly engulfed the wooden temple. The fire burned for two days, destroying countless precious Buddhist relics as well as numerous trees. The only remaining relics are a bronze monument and a bronze doorway from the Ming dynasty, and a bronze statue from the Qing dynasty.

In 2004, as part of the Jinding "Revival and Renovation Plan" by the Mt. Emei Buddhist Association, the Huazang Temple was rebuilt along with a 48-meter-tall stupa of the "Ten-faced Puxian Bodhisattva" (Samantabhadra). The rebuilt temple was officially opened on 18 June 2006. 300 notable Buddhist monks attended the grand ceremony, as well as 3,000 visitors. The reconstruction is seen as a prestigious project for the local authorities, and has helped to attract tourists and religious pilgrims alike. However, it has also been criticized as an attempt to increase revenue. The new structures have been called "inauthentic" and purely "invented".

In March 2016, the Puxian stupa was temporarily closed for renovation.

Structures 
The complex is built along a central axis on a slope, from the lowest to the highest are the stupa, the main hall and the Puxian hall.

On one side, the bodhisattva holds a ruyi, while on the other, his hands forms the Dhyana Mudra meditation gesture. Inside the stupa is a statue of Maitreya. The stupa was designed by the Taiwanese architect Chu-Yuan Lee.

The Grand Hall of the Great Sage (or Mahavira Hall) is the main hall, housing statues of the Gautama Buddha and two disciples.

Gallery

Notes

Buddhist temples in Sichuan
Architecture in China
Geography of Sichuan